Gangster Squad is a 2013 American action crime thriller film directed by Ruben Fleischer, written by Will Beall, based on the non-fiction book by Paul Lieberman, and starring Josh Brolin, Ryan Gosling, Nick Nolte, Emma Stone, Anthony Mackie, Giovanni Ribisi, Robert Patrick, Michael Peña and Sean Penn. Set in 1949, it is a fictionalized account of the group of real-life LAPD officers and detectives, called the Gangster Squad, who brought down crime kingpin Mickey Cohen and his gang.

After the script spent several years on the Black List, production began in September 2011 around Los Angeles, lasting through December. The film was originally set to be theatrically released September 7, 2012, but in the wake of the 2012 Aurora, Colorado, shooting, Warner Bros. pushed it back to a January 11, 2013, release to accommodate re-shoots, which took place in August 2012.

It received mixed reviews from critics, who praised the cast and production values but criticized the thinly-written characters. It grossed $105 million worldwide.

Plot
In 1949 Los Angeles, crime boss Mickey Cohen has become the most powerful figure in the California criminal underworld and intends to expand his criminal enterprise to encompass the entire West Coast. The LAPD has not been able to stop his ruthless rise, as he has eliminated witnesses, hired dirty cops to protect his activities, and avoided prosecution through corruption in the justice system.

Determined to put a stop to Cohen, LAPD Chief Bill Parker creates a secret police unit tasked with dismantling Cohen's enterprise. The unit, composed of officers who do not carry badges and are authorized to act outside of the law, are led by the skilled World War II OSS veteran Sergeant John O'Mara. With the help of his wife, Connie, he recruits Detective Jerry Wooters and four incorruptible misfit officers: knife-wielding Lieutenant Coleman Harris, wire tapping expert and family man Conwell Keeler, outlaw sharpshooter Max Kennard, and Kennard's rookie protégé Navidad Ramirez.

Despite initial setbacks, such as a casino raid thwarted by corrupt Burbank police officers, the Squad strikes several successful blows at the heart of Cohen's operations, including shutting down his lucrative wire gambling business. They break into Cohen's mansion and Keeler plants a bug in the back of a television. As a result, Cohen believes someone has betrayed him and lashes out at those around him, including his etiquette tutor Grace Faraday. Wooters and Faraday have entered into a secret romantic relationship, and he tries to help her escape from Cohen, enlisting the help of mutual friend and gangster Jack Whalen.

Realizing the attackers have never stolen his money, Cohen deduces they are cops and realizes that they have bugged his house. He uses it to lure the Squad into an unsuccessful ambush in Chinatown while Keeler is executed by a hitman. When Faraday witnesses Cohen murder Whalen, she agrees to testify against her former employer. O'Mara forces the crooked Judge Carter to sign an arrest warrant before leading the Squad to the Park Plaza Hotel to arrest Cohen.

Cohen and his men engage in a lengthy shootout with the Squad, during which Wooters and Kennard are wounded. Cohen and his bodyguard Karl Lennox escape, but O'Mara rams their vehicle into a fountain. Navidad helps a dying Kennard shoot Lennox, saving O'Mara. Cohen and O'Mara fight each other in a brutal bareknuckle brawl while onlookers and journalists gather. O'Mara finally beats Cohen and has him arrested, ending his reign over Los Angeles.

The film explains that the Gangster Squad has never been mentioned for its role in keeping the Mafia from gaining a foothold in L.A., and that its surviving members remain secret. Cohen is sentenced to life imprisonment at Alcatraz, and is greeted with a lead-pipe beating by inmates who were friends of Whalen. Harris and Ramirez partner together to walk the beat, Wooters and Faraday continue their relationship, and O'Mara quits his job with the LAPD to live a quiet life with his wife and newborn son.

Cast

Production

Filming
Principal photography began on September 6, 2011, in Los Angeles. Sets were located all over Los Angeles County, from north of the San Fernando Valley to south of the county border. Sets were also recreated in Sony Pictures Studios in Culver City. Filming wrapped on December 15, 2011.

Association with the 2012 Aurora, Colorado shooting
In the wake of the theater shooting in Aurora, Colorado, on July 20, it was pulled from running before films and airing on television, and removed from Apple's trailer site and YouTube due to a scene where characters fire submachine guns at movie-goers through the screen of Grauman's Chinese Theatre.

It was later reported that the theater scene from the film would be either removed or placed in a different setting, since it is a crucial part of the film, and the film would undergo additional re-shoots of several scenes to accommodate these changes, which resulted in the film's release being moved to a later date. About a week after the Aurora shootings, Warner Bros. officially confirmed that the film would be released on January 11, 2013. Two weeks later, on August 22, the cast reunited in Los Angeles to completely re-shoot the film's main action sequence. The new sequence was set in a version of Chinatown, where the gangsters strike back at the Squad. Josh Brolin said he was not sad the original scene was cut and admitted that the new version was just as violent.

Release and reception

Box office 
Gangster Squad grossed $46 million in the United States and Canada, and $59.2 million in other territories, for a worldwide total of $105.2 million, against a production budget of $60 million.
 
The film grossed $17.1 million in its opening weekend, finishing third at the box office behind Zero Dark Thirty and A Haunted House. It then made $8.6 million in its second weekend (including $10.1 million over the four-day MLK weekend) and $4.3 million in its third weekend.

Home media 
Gangster Squad was released on DVD and Blu-ray on April 23, 2013. The Blu-ray includes director's commentary from Ruben Fleischer and several segments about the real life men and stories of the Gangster Squad and Mickey Cohen. As of June 2013, it had made $9.6 million from DVD sales and $6.7 million from Blu-ray, for a total of $16.3 million in sales.

Critical response
On review aggregator Rotten Tomatoes, the film holds an approval rating of 31% based on 207 reviews, with an average rating of 5/10. The website's critical consensus reads, "Though it's stylish and features a talented cast, Gangster Squad suffers from lackluster writing, underdeveloped characters, and an excessive amount of violence." On Metacritic, it has a weighted average score of 40 out of 100, based on 38 critics, indicating "mixed or average reviews". Audiences polled by CinemaScore gave it an average grade of "B+" on an A+ to F scale.

Reviewers at Spill.com gave it a "Rental," praising its stylish design but criticizing the dialogue, Emma Stone's underdeveloped "damsel-in-distress" character, and Sean Penn's laughable makeup. IGN editor Chris Tilly wrote, "Gangster Squad looks great but frustrates because with the talent involved, it had the potential to be so much more", and rated it 6.3/10. Richard Roeper gave it a B+, saying "Gangster Squad is a highly stylized, pulp-fiction period piece based on true events" and noted its strong performances.

Filling in for Roger Ebert of the Chicago Sun-Times, Jeff Shannon gave the film 2 stars out of 4, saying that Fleischer, better known for his comedic work, was "out of his element, and barely suppressing his urge to spoof the genre". He further criticized the stock characters and the film's generally uneven tone, but praised action highlights such as the car chase, and flashes of brilliance in Sean Penn's performance.

Historical accuracy 
Although the film is inspired by the real-life LAPD Gangster Squad, much of it is fabricated.
 The film portrays Cohen organizing the murder of his predecessor Jack Dragna. In reality, Cohen largely sidelined Dragna as head of the Los Angeles crime family but otherwise left him alone; Dragna died of a heart attack in 1956.
 The film shows Cohen's primary business as gambling, with prostitution and drug dealing as sidelines. In reality, Cohen's main racket was bookmaking; he detested drugs.
 William Parker was only 45 in 1949, not in his 70s like Nick Nolte (Parker died at age 61 in 1966). He also did not create the Gangster Squad; it was created by Chief Clemence B. Horrall in 1946, and was largely an effort to improve the city's image, regardless of whether it actually pursued criminals.
 The film concludes with Cohen being arrested in 1949 for murder and sent to Alcatraz. In reality, he was imprisoned in 1951 and again in 1961 for tax evasion. He was, however, attacked with a lead pipe while in prison, as the film states.
 While Anthony Mackie and Michael Peña are members of the film's Squad, the real Squad was entirely white.
 While it is possible Cohen murdered Jack Whalen in real life, it was not at Whalen's home as depicted in the film. Whalen was shot in 1959 while at dinner with Cohen and three of his associates, and Cohen was not officially accused of it.
 Cohen's bodyguard Johnny Stompanato was not shot as depicted in the film, but lived until 1958, when he was stabbed by Cheryl Crane, the daughter of his girlfriend Lana Turner.
 The character of Max Kennard was based on real life lawman Doug "Jumbo" Kennard, who was killed in a 1952 drunk car crash after he had retired, not shot in the line of duty as in the film.
 In the film, Conwell Keeler is the first member of the Squad to be killed. In real life, he outlived all of the Squad's other members, dying of a stroke in 2012.

References

External links
 
 
 
 
 

2013 films
2013 crime thriller films
2010s police films
American crime thriller films
American police detective films
Fictional portrayals of the Los Angeles Police Department
Films about Jewish-American organized crime
Films directed by Ruben Fleischer
Films produced by Dan Lin
Films scored by Steve Jablonsky
Films set in the 1940s
Films set in 1949
Films set in Los Angeles
Films shot in Los Angeles
Films with screenplays by Will Beall
Village Roadshow Pictures films
Warner Bros. films
Advertising and marketing controversies in film
Political controversies in film
Film controversies in the United States
2010s English-language films
2010s American films